Bad Boys is a series of American buddy cop action comedy films created by George Gallo. It stars Will Smith and Martin Lawrence as two detectives in the Miami Police Department, Mike Lowrey and Marcus Burnett. Joe Pantoliano and Theresa Randle also appear in all three films. Michael Bay directed the first two films and Adil & Bilall took over directional duties for the third. Gabrielle Union, who starred in the second installment, later starred alongside Jessica Alba in a spin-off television series, L.A.'s Finest.

The series has grossed over $840 million worldwide. The first film received mixed reviews from critics, the second was unfavorably received and the third had a generally positive reception.

Films

Bad Boys (1995)

Detectives Mike Lowery and Marcus Burnett have 72 hours to find $100 million worth of heroin before Internal Affairs shuts them down. Lowery becomes more involved after a friend is murdered by the drug dealers. Matters become complicated when Lowery and Burnett have to switch places to convince a witness of the murder to cooperate.

Principal photography began on June 27 in downtown Miami and wrapped August 31, 1994.

Bad Boys II (2003)

Mike and Marcus head up a task force investigating the flow of ecstasy into Miami. Their search leads to a dangerous kingpin Johnny Tapia, whose plan to control the city's drug traffic has touched off an underground war. Meanwhile Mike and Syd, Marcus's sister are in a secret relationship.

Bad Boys for Life (2020)

In June 2008, Michael Bay stated that he may direct Bad Boys III, but that the greatest obstacle to the potential sequel would be the cost, as he and Will Smith demand some of the highest salaries in the film industry. By August 2009, Columbia Pictures had hired Peter Craig to write the script for Bad Boys III. In February 2011, Martin Lawrence reiterated that the film was in development. In June 2014, Jerry Bruckheimer announced that screenwriter David Guggenheim was working on the storyline for the sequel. Two months later, Lawrence said a script had been written and parts had been cast. By June 2015, director Joe Carnahan was in early talks to write and possibly direct the film. Two months later, Sony Pictures Entertainment announced that Bad Boys III would be released on February 17, 2017. On March 4, 2016, the film was pushed to June 2, 2017. Producers had planned to begin production in early 2017.

On August 11, 2016, the film was pushed back once again to January 12, 2018, to avoid box office competition with the upcoming DC Comics film Wonder Woman, and retitled Bad Boys for Life. Lawrence revealed on Jimmy Kimmel Live! that filming may start in March 2017. On March 7, 2017, Carnahan left the film due to scheduling conflicts, and in August 2017 Sony removed the film from their release schedule. In August 2017, Lawrence said that he doubted that the film would ever be made. During an appearance on Australian breakfast show Sunrise on January 15, 2018, Will Smith told hosts Samantha Armytage and David Koch that a third film was coming "very soon". On January 30, 2018, it was announced that Sony Pictures were in negotiations with Adil El Arbi and Bilall Fallah to direct the upcoming third entry in the Bad Boys franchise titled Bad Boys for Life with a possible production date in August, 2018. Sony is reportedly gearing up for the long-awaited third installment to begin filming in November 2018 and wrap in March 2019.

In November 2018, Martin Lawrence officially revealed via Instagram that he and co-star Will Smith would return for a sequel. Joe Pantoliano is also set to reprise his role as Captain Howard. Vanessa Hudgens, Alexander Ludwig and Charles Melton were announced in the cast on December 20, 2018. Jacob Scipio and Paola Nuñez were announced in the cast on December 21, 2018. Filming began on January 7, 2019.

Untitled fourth Bad Boys film (TBA)
In January 2020, a fourth film entered development, with Chris Bremner serving as screenwriter. Smith and Lawrence will reprise their roles from the previous three movies. As of April 2022, production for the film has been halted due to the incident with Smith slapping Chris Rock at the 2022 Academy Awards ceremony and the subsequent investigation. In February 2023, Smith announced that the fourth film was in pre-production. That same month, it was reported by musician/disc jockey Questlove that Smith had to drop out of a planned surprise appearance at the 65th Grammy Awards because filming for the fourth Bad Boys film had started earlier that week.

Television

L.A.'s Finest (2019–2020)

In October 2017, a spinoff television series centered on Gabrielle Union's character, was announced to be in development by Brandon Margolis and Brandon Sonnier. Later that month NBC ordered the pilot episode of the series.
By March 2018, Jessica Alba was cast as the co-star with Gabrielle Union. In addition to Union, John Salley will also reprise his role as Fletcher, a computer hacker who helps Mike and Marcus in the film series. The following month, the title of the series was revealed as LA's Finest, with Jerry Bruckheimer serving as executive producer for the series. Later that month, NBC passed on the pilot, and the show was shopped around to other networks. NBC's boss, Bob Greenblatt, said: "These are all tough calls. We did have an embarrassment of riches. And when we laid out the schedule and the calendar all season...it was a show that didn't fit in the grand scheme of it."

That same month, it was revealed that Sony Pictures Television, was negotiating with Charter Communications about picking up the series. By June 2018, Canada's Bell Media picked it up for 13 episodes. Charter gave its series order on June 26, intent on making it Spectrum's first original series. In June 2019, the series was renewed for the second season.

Cast and crew

Cast

Additional crew

Reception

Box office performance

Critical and audience response

Video games
Bad Boys: Miami Takedown, is a video game released in 2004 based on the sequel Bad Boys II. It was released in early 2004 after the film's DVD and VHS release.

References

External links
 

 
Action film franchises
American film series
Fictional portrayals of the Miami-Dade Police Department
Columbia Pictures franchises
Film series introduced in 1995
1990s English-language films
2000s English-language films
2020s English-language films